Nerašte is a village in the municipality of Tearce, North Macedonia.

Demographics
As of the 2021 census, Nerašte had 2,724 residents with the following ethnic composition:
Albanians 2,670
Persons for whom data are taken from administrative sources 51
Macedonians 2
Others 1

According to the 2002 census, the village had a total of 3,485 inhabitants. Ethnic groups in the village include:

Albanians 3478
Others 7

References

External links

Villages in Tearce Municipality
Albanian communities in North Macedonia